Adolf of Egmond (Grave, February 12, 1438 – Tournai, June 27, 1477) was a Duke of Guelders, Count of Zutphen from 1465–1471 and in 1477.

Life
Adolf was the son of Arnold, Duke of Guelders and Catherine of Cleves. In the battle of succession for Guelders, he imprisoned in 1465 his own father and became Duke with the support of Philip the Good, who also made him Knight in the Order of the Golden Fleece. In 1468 he won the Battle of Straelen against Cleves, but Charles the Bold reinstated his father Arnold, and Adolf was imprisoned in Hesdin.

After the death of Charles the Bold in 1477, Adolf was liberated by the Flemish. He died the same year at the head of a Flemish army besieging Tournai, after the States of Guelders had recognized him as Duke. His body was buried in Tournai Cathedral.

Family and issue
Adolf married Catharine of Bourbon (1440–1469), daughter of Charles I, Duke of Bourbon, in 1463. They had twin children :
 Philippa (1467–1547), married in 1485 René II, Duke of Lorraine (1451–1508)
 Charles (1467–1538), later Duke of Guelders, married in 1518 with Elisabeth of Brunswick-Lüneburg (1494–1572), daughter of Henry I of Lüneburg.

Ancestors

References

Sources

1438 births
1477 deaths
People from Grave, North Brabant
House of Egmond
Dukes of Guelders
Knights of the Golden Fleece
15th-century people of the Holy Roman Empire